Chrysomyxa abietis, or spruce needle rust, is a species of rust fungi in the Coleosporiaceae family that is native to eastern Europe (including Siberia) and northern Asia. It was introduced to Australia, New Zealand and the United States.

Description
It is also hypophyllous and have either yellow of orange spots (depending on the season). The spots are elongate, erumpent and waxy. It teliospores are aseptate, hyaline and oblong.

Habitat
It is found on spruce.

References

Further reading

abietis
Fungi of Asia
Fungi of Europe